Fantasy World Dizzy is an arcade adventure video game released in October 1989 by Codemasters and designed by the Oliver Twins.

The game is considered the third in the Dizzy series and was developed under the name Dizzy III. The third Dizzy game to be released, Fast Food, was regarded as a spin-off that deviated from the standard Dizzy format.

Fantasy World Dizzy was the first Dizzy adventure to feature many elements which later became standard for the series, such as having three lives, an improved inventory system and a balance between puzzle-solving and hazards. This game also introduced the Yolkfolk: Daisy, Denzil, Dozy, Dylan and Grand-Dizzy.

A Nintendo Entertainment System version titled Mystery World Dizzy was developed in April 1993 but was not released until 24 years later in April 2017. It's available free on the official Dizzy website. A Kickstarter campaign has also been started to produce the game on a physical NES cartridge.

In recent years it has grown more famous due to frequent references made to it in the Zero Punctuation video game review series as "the best game ever", albeit ironically.

Plot
The game's plot revolves around Dizzy and his girlfriend Daisy. Daisy is taken by the King Troll while walking through a forest with Dizzy, and he has to chase after her. On his way Dizzy must also collect 30 coins. Some of them are hidden quite well.

Reception
The game was given a rating of 9 out of 10 by Peter Parrish of Eurogamer. The ZX Spectrum version was voted the 25th best game of all time in a special issue of Your Sinclair magazine in 2004. Amstrad Action rated its version as 89%.

In October 1994, Commodore Format magazine, included a full playable version of the game on their covertape.

References

External links 
 Official website for Mystery World Dizzy
 
 
 Illustrated Fantasy World Dizzy story
 Power play Reception, p.32

1989 video games
Amiga games
Amstrad CPC games
Atari Jaguar games
Atari ST games
Codemasters games
Commodore 64 games
Dizzy (series)
DOS games
Europe-exclusive video games
Video games scored by Allister Brimble
Video games scored by David Whittaker
ZX Spectrum games
Single-player video games
Video games developed in the United Kingdom